Stefan Giglio (born 26 February 1979 in Valletta, Malta) is a professional footballer who currently plays for Maltese First Division side Żurrieq, where he plays as a midfielder.

Giglio has been called to play for the Malta national football team during some time or another, and also had spells in Bulgarian top flight. His preferred squad number is 26, his birthday.

Playing career

Valletta

International goals
Scores and results list. Malta's goal tally first.

External links

1979 births
Living people
Maltese footballers
Malta international footballers
Maltese expatriate footballers
Valletta F.C. players
PFC CSKA Sofia players
FC Lokomotiv 1929 Sofia players
Sliema Wanderers F.C. players
Qormi F.C. players
Association football midfielders
First Professional Football League (Bulgaria) players
Expatriate footballers in Bulgaria
Maltese expatriate sportspeople in Bulgaria
People from Valletta